Bieliny may refer to the following places:
Bieliny, Grójec County in Masovian Voivodeship (east-central Poland)
Bieliny, Subcarpathian Voivodeship (south-east Poland)
Bieliny, Świętokrzyskie Voivodeship (south-central Poland)
Bieliny, Pruszków County in Masovian Voivodeship (east-central Poland)
Bieliny, Przysucha County in Masovian Voivodeship (east-central Poland)
Bieliny, Radom County in Masovian Voivodeship (east-central Poland)
Bieliny, Gmina Brochów in Masovian Voivodeship (east-central Poland)
Bieliny, Gmina Młodzieszyn in Masovian Voivodeship (east-central Poland)
Bieliny, Warsaw West County in Masovian Voivodeship (east-central Poland)
Bieliny, Warmian-Masurian Voivodeship (north Poland)